Lefteris Poulios (born 1944) is a Greek poet.

He belongs to the so-called 1970s Generation, which is a literary term referring to Greek authors who began publishing their work during the 1970s, and especially towards the end of the Greek military junta of 1967–74 and at the first years of the Metapolitefsi.

Works
Ποίηση (Poetry), 1969
Ποίηση 2 (Poetry 2), 1973
Ποίηση 1, 2 (Poetry 1, 2), 1975
Ο Γυμνός Ομιλητής (The Nude Orator), 1977
Το αλληγορικό σχολείο (The Allegorical School), 1978
Τα ποιήματα Επιλογή 1969-1978 (Collected Poems 1969-1978), 1982
Ενάντια (Anti), 1983
Αντί της σιωπής (Instead of Silence), 1993
Το διπλανό δωμάτιο (The next door room), 1998
Tο Μωσαϊκό (The Mosaic), 2001

External links
His page at the website of the Hellenic Authors' Society (Greek) and (English)
His books at Kedros publishers

1944 births
20th-century Greek poets
Living people
Greek male poets
20th-century Greek male writers